Haris Dilaver (born 6 February 1990) is a Bosnian professional footballer who plays as a winger for Maltese Premier League club Valletta.

Honours
Mladost Doboj Kakanj
First League of FBiH: 2014–15

References

External links 

1990 births
Living people
Sportspeople from Zenica
Association football midfielders
Bosnia and Herzegovina footballers
NK Čelik Zenica players
NK Vitez players
FK Mladost Doboj Kakanj players
Platanias F.C. players
FC Nasaf players
KF Vllaznia Shkodër players
Premier League of Bosnia and Herzegovina players
Super League Greece players
Uzbekistan Super League players
Kategoria Superiore players
Bosnia and Herzegovina expatriate footballers
Expatriate footballers in Greece
Bosnia and Herzegovina expatriate sportspeople in Greece
Expatriate footballers in Uzbekistan
Bosnia and Herzegovina expatriate sportspeople in Uzbekistan
Expatriate footballers in Albania
Bosnia and Herzegovina expatriate sportspeople in Albania